Ghatu may refer to:

 Ghatu (dance), Nepalese folk dance of Gurung community.
 Ghatu (song), Bengali folk song.